Bolle reiste jüngst zu Pfingsten (Bolle made a trip on whitsun) is a folk song in the Berlin dialect. The song mocks the stereotype of Berliners as unrestrictedly revelrous.

According to music professor Lukas Richter the song is of the Schwank type common in German-speaking countries. (compare to Oh du lieber Augustin). The song makes references to Pankow which was a suburb of Berlin in the middle of the 19th century. At that time it was a common conduct for people from Berlin to board a Kremser van - the Berlin variant of a charabanc - to drive out of town to one of the inns, in the case of this song one of the many around the Schönholzer Heide park that were a popular destination for day-trippers.

The name Bolle (meaning "onion" in Berlin dialect) refers to an indeterminate person, and there is no evidence that it refers to the Berlin merchant Carl Bolle or Fritze Bollmann.

As common for a folk song there are a number of recordings available which show variants in wording as well as the number of verses. The song is also changed deliberately when used to make a political statement by using the refrain "but whatever happened, Bolle had his fun" (Aber dennoch hat sich Bolle ganz köstlich amüsiert.)

Song

References 

Volkslied
Music in Berlin
Songs about cities
Year of song unknown
Songwriter unknown